HD 169830 is a star in the southern constellation of Sagittarius. It has a yellow-white hue and is dimly visible to the naked eye with an apparent visual magnitude of +5.90. The star is located at a distance of 120 light years from the Sun based on parallax. HD 169830 is known to be orbited by two large Jupiter-like exoplanets.

This is an F-type main-sequence star with a stellar classification of F7V. It is 3.83 billion years old and chromospherically inactive with a slow rotation rate, having a projected rotational velocity of 3.83 km/s. This star is 40% more massive and 84% larger than the Sun. Combining the mass and radius makes the surface gravity only 41% that of the Sun. It is radiating 4.6 times the luminosity of the Sun from its photosphere at an effective temperature of 6,300 K.

A candidate stellar companion, designated component B, lies at an angular separation of  along a position angle of 265°.

Planetary system
On April 15, 2000, the Geneva Extrasolar Planet Search Team announced the discovery of a minimum mass  planet in a 226-day orbit. Three years later on June 30, 2003, the same team, using the same method, discovered a minimum mass  second planet orbiting the star. In 2022, the inclination and true mass of HD 169830 c were measured via astrometry.

See also
HD 69830
List of extrasolar planets

References

External links
 
 Extrasolar Planet Interactions by Rory Barnes & Richard Greenberg, Lunar and Planetary Lab, University of Arizona



F-type main-sequence stars
Planetary systems with two confirmed planets
Sagittarius (constellation)
J18274949-2949007
CD-29 14965
169830
090485
6907